The 1986–87 Arizona Wildcats men's basketball team represented the University of Arizona during the 1986–87 NCAA Division I men's basketball season. The head coach was Lute Olson. The team played its home games in the McKale Center in Tucson, Arizona, and was a member of the Pacific-10 Conference. The Wildcats finished with an overall record of 18–12 (13–5 Pac-10) and reached the NCAA tournament, but lost in the opening round for the third consecutive year.

Roster

Schedule and results

|-
!colspan=12 style=| Non-conference regular season

|-
!colspan=12 style=| Pac-10 regular season

|-
!colspan=12 style=| Pac-10 Tournament

|-
!colspan=12 style=| NCAA Tournament

Sources

Rankings

References

Arizona
Arizona Wildcats men's basketball seasons
Arizona
Arizona Wildcats men's basketball team
Arizona Wildcats men's basketball team